Nadine Müller (born 21 November 1985) is a German discus thrower.

She was born in Leipzig. As a teenager, she won the silver medal at the 2003 European Junior Championships and the bronze medal at the 2004 World Junior Championships. Her personal best throw as a junior was 57.85 metres, achieved in May 2004 in Wiesbaden.

She improved gradually to 59.35 metres in May 2005 and 62.93 metres in May 2007, both in Halle. She competed at the 2007 World Championships, but without reaching the final. In May 2009 she improved to 63.46 metres in a meet in Wiesbaden. She finished fourth at the 2009 European Team Championships, Super League, and sixth at the 2009 World Championships.

She started the 2010 season well by setting a new personal best – having already won gold at the 2010 European Cup Winter Throwing competition, she used her last throw of the contest to push her limits and threw a best of 64.30 m. She threw even further a few months later, winning the 15th Throwers Cup in Wiesbaden with a world leading mark of 67.78 m.

Personal life
Nadine Müller married her partner Sabine in a civil union on New Year's Eve 2013.

Achievements

References

External links
 
 
 
 
 
 
 
 

1985 births
Living people
German female discus throwers
German national athletics champions
Athletes (track and field) at the 2012 Summer Olympics
Athletes (track and field) at the 2016 Summer Olympics
Olympic athletes of Germany
World Athletics Championships medalists
European Athletics Championships medalists
German LGBT sportspeople
Lesbian sportswomen
World Athletics Championships athletes for Germany
Athletes from Leipzig
SC DHfK Leipzig athletes
LGBT track and field athletes